Kyabje Dungse Thinley Norbu Rinpoche (1931 – December 26, 2011) was a major modern teacher in the Nyingma lineage of Tibetan Buddhism, and patron of the Vajrayana Foundation. He was the eldest son of Dudjom Rinpoche, the former head of the Nyingma lineages, and also the father of Dzongsar Jamyang Khyentse Rinpoche and Dungse Garab Rinpoche. His association with the Dudjom Lineage is a long one: he is held to be the incarnation of Tulku Drime Oser, who was one of seven sons of Dudjom Lingpa.  He also was considered to be an emanation of Longchen Rabjam, the great 14th-century Nyingma scholar and siddha who composed the Seven Treasuries. He died in California on December 26, 2011, according to the Tibetan Buddhist Lunar Calendar the 2nd day of the 11th month of the Iron Rabbit year. His cremation was held in a public buddhist cremation ceremony in Paro, Bhutan on March 3, 2012, which was attended by several thousand people, including some of Bhutan's royal family.

Biography

Dungse Thinley Norbu Rinpoche was born in 1931 in Lhasa, Tibet. In his autobiography he states: "I was born in Lhasa, between east and west, in the center, near the Rasa Trulnang Tsuklakhang (Temple of Miraculous Goat-Earth Phenomena) in Lhasa, known as the Jokhang Temple."

His father was the renowned Nyingma Buddhist master Dudjom Jigdral Yeshe Dorje, and his mother was Kusho Tseten Yudron. In his youth in Tibet, he studied for nine years at Mindrolling Monastery, one of the six major monasteries of the Nyingma school in Tibet, and received many teachings from many great saints throughout the region, besides his own father.

In the mid 1950s, Thinley Norbu left Tibet at the onset of the Chinese invasion of Tibet. Having fled his homeland, he spent some time in Bhutan, where his children were born. There he served as the chief architect of the Thimphu Memorial Chorten, built in 1974 under the guidance of his father, to honor the memory of the Third King of Bhutan, Jigme Dorji Wangchuck (1928–72).

Thinley Norbu first came to the United States of America in 1976 to seek medical treatment, and then spent a number of years in Nepal before permanently settling in the US in the early 1980s. 

In the late 1980s and early 1990s, after spending a number of years in New York City, Thinley Norbu sought out a quiet place for practice in the countryside of the east coast of the United States. After a long search, in 1991 he chose some land in the rolling hills of upstate New York and named it Kunzang Gatshal, Always Noble Joyful Park. For the next twenty years, Kunzang Gatshal served as Thinley Norbu's primary residence and focal point of dharma activity. He gave teachings to disciples on this land, and was visited by other lamas, including Kyabje Penor Rinpoche and Kyabje Dodrupchen Rinpoche. 

In the mid-1990s, Thinley Norbu built a temple on the land, personally directing all aspects of the construction and design until every statue and offering had been set. At around the same time, he founded a school for young children to learn pure dharma tradition and practice, White Lotus School, which he looked after with particular care. 

After settling in New York, Thinley Norbu traveled back several times to the East. In 1986, during a lull in Tibet-China relations, he went back to Tibet where he secretly gave many teachings to Tibetan disciples. He also frequently travelled to Pema Osel Ling, California, the center of Lama Tharchin Rinpoche. He helped with the final sculpting of the face of the Guru Rinpoche statue in Pema Osel Ling, and also gave many teachings there, including the full Dudjom Tersar empowerments during the summer of 1995. 

Most of his later years were spent at Kunzang Gatshal, giving spoken teachings and writing more than a dozen books, many of which were published posthumously, and several that still remain unpublished. Thinley Norbu's books have become quite popular in the west, but in contrast to many other Tibetan teachers he did not seek publicity or large numbers of students.

In 2009, although in poor health, Thinley Norbu again travelled to Asia, spending several months in Nepal and Bhutan before returning to the US in 2010.

Death 
Thinley Norbu died in Palm Desert, California on December 26, 2011, which according to the Tibetan Buddhist Lunar Calendar is the 2nd day of the 11th month of the Iron Rabbit year. His body was transported to his temple at Kunzang Gatshal in upstate, New York where it stayed for several weeks before being flown to Paro, Bhutan and driven around the country so disciples could pay their respects. 

His cremation was held in a public buddhist cremation ceremony in Paro, Bhutan on March 3, 2012, and presided over by the third Dudjom Rinpoche, Sangye Pema Zhepa, the reincarnation of Thinley Norbu Rinpoche's father, the second Dudjom Rinpoche, Jigdral Yeshe Dorje.

A memorial of Thinley Norbu Rinpoche has been built on the site of his cremation in Paro, Bhutan, by his son Dungse Garab Rinpoche. 

Since Thinley Norbu's death in 2011, Kunzang Gatshal has been guided by the students of White Lotus School, his sons Garab Dorje Rinpoche and Jampal Dorje Rinpoche, and other family members.

Family

Parents and siblings 
Thinley Norbu's father was Dudjom Jigdral Yeshe Dorje (English: Fearless Wisdom Vajra). His mother was Mayum Tseten Yudron (English: Turquoise Lamp of Firm Life). Thinley Norbu's parents had seven children: 

Semo Dechen Yudron ( English: Turquoise Radiance of Great Bliss.) 

Thinley Norbu ( English: Jewel of Activity) was the oldest son. 

Chokyi Nyima Rinpoche ( English: Sun of Dharma). 

Semo Pema Yudron ( English: Lotus of Turquoise Light). 

Pende Norbu Rinpoche ( English: Jewel of Beneficial Well-Being). 

Se Dorje Palzang ( English: Indestructible Noble Glory). 

Semo Tsering Yangchen ( English: Melodious Long Life) 

When Thinley Norbu was 13 years old his parents separated, and his father later married Sangyum Rigdzin Wangmo giving him four more half-siblings. Dekyong Yeshe Wangmo, Chimey Wangmo, Tsering Penzom, and Shenphen Dawa Norbu Rinpoche (1950-2018).

Wife and children 
Thinley Norbu's wife was Sangyum Jamyang Chödrön ( Smooth Melodious Lamp of Dharma), and like his parents they had seven children, three daughters and four sons. 

Semo Kelsang Chodron, Dzongsar Khyentse Norbu Rinpoche (b.1961), Semo Yeshe Palzom (b.1966), Garab Dorje Rinpoche (b.1967), Jampel Dorje Rinpoche (b.1968), Semo Pema Chokyi (b.1976), and Se Ugyen Namgyal.

Works

During his exile in the West he wrote a number of books, including many that were published or distributed posthumously:

 (1974) Account of the Great Chaitya of Thimbu. Thinley Norbu. Thimphu, Bhutan. LCCN 74901523  (republished in "The Collected Works of Dungse Thinley Norbu Rinpoche, 2009").
(1984–1989) The Practice of the Essence of the Sublime Heart Jewel, Meditation and Action, The Propitious Speech from the Beginning, Middle and End. Written by Patrul Rinpoche, translated by Thinley Norbu. New York, NY: Jewel Publication House. .
 (1985) The Small Golden Key to the Treasure of the Various Essential Necessities of General and Extraordinary Buddhist Dharma. Translated by Lisa Anderson (second edition). New York, NY: Jewel Publishing House. .
 (1982) Magic Dance: The Display of the Self-Nature of the Five Wisdom Dakinis. .
 (1992) White Sail: Crossing the Waves of Ocean Mind to the Serene Continent of the Triple Gems.  Boston, MA: Shambhala Publications. .
 (1997) Welcoming Flowers from Across the Cleansed Threshold of Hope: An Answer to the Pope's Criticism of Buddhism. New York, NY: Jewel Publication House. .
 (2006, 2008) A Cascading Waterfall of Nectar. Boston, MA: Shambhala Publications. .
(2009) The Collected Works of Dungse Thinley Norbu Rinpoche. Hong Kong, PRC: hong kong gyi ling dpe skrun tshad yod kung si Publications. Volume 1 of 3: , Volume 2 of 3: , Volume 3 of 3: . 
 (2012) (English: The Sole Panacea). KGF Publications. Delhi, NY.
(2013) The Sole Panacea: A Brief Commentary on the Seven-Line Prayer to Guru Rinpoche That Cures the Suffering of the Sickness of Karma and Defilement. Boston, MA: Shambhala Publications. .
 (2015) A Brief Fantasy History of A Himalayan: Autobiographical Reflections. Boston, MA: Shambhala Publications. .
 (2015) Sunlight Speech That Dispels the Darkness of Doubt: Sublime Prayers, Praises, and Practices of the Nyingma Masters. Boston, MA: Shambhala Publications. .
(2016) Gypsy Gossip and Other Advice. Boulder, CO: Shambhala Publications. .
 (2016) Echoes: The Boudhanath Teachings. Boulder, CO: Shambhala Publications. .
(2021) Sunlight Speech That Dispels the Darkness of Doubt: Sublime Prayers, Praises, and Practices of the Nyingma Masters. Trans. Thinley Norbu. Boulder, CO: Shambhala Publications. .
(2021) (English: The Unbroken Lineage Rosary of Continuously Descending Nectar). KGF Publications. Delhi, NY. .
(2022) The Ruby Rosary: Joyfully Accepted by Vidyadharas and Dakinis as the Ornament of a Necklace. Boston, MA: Shambhala Publications. .

References

External links
Kunzang Gatshal Foundation
Vajrayana Foundation
TBRC Profile
Saraha Nyingma Buddhist Institute

1931 births
2011 deaths
20th-century lamas
Dzogchen lamas
Nyingma lamas
Rinpoches
Tibetan Buddhists from Tibet